Brush Creek Township is one of the twenty-five townships of Muskingum County, Ohio, United States.  The 2000 census found 1,375 people in the township.

Geography
Located on the southern edge of the county, it borders the following townships:
Wayne Township - northeast
Harrison Township - east
York Township, Morgan County - south
Clay Township - southwest
Newton Township - west
Springfield Township - northwest

No municipalities are located in Brush Creek Township.

Name and history
Statewide, other Brush Creek Townships are located in Adams, Jefferson, and Scioto counties, plus a Brushcreek Township in Highland County.

Government
The township is governed by a three-member board of trustees, who are elected in November of odd-numbered years to a four-year term beginning on the following January 1. Two are elected in the year after the presidential election and one is elected in the year before it. There is also an elected township fiscal officer, who serves a four-year term beginning on April 1 of the year after the election, which is held in November of the year before the presidential election. Vacancies in the fiscal officership or on the board of trustees are filled by the remaining trustees.

References

External links
County website

Townships in Muskingum County, Ohio
Townships in Ohio